Cocalus is a genus of jumping spiders that was first described by Carl Ludwig Koch in 1846, and is named after Cocalus, a Sicilian king of Greek mythology.

At least one species, Cocalus gibbosus, does not adhere to spider silk and will sometimes invade the webs of other spiders and stalk across the webs to feed on them, preferring spiders over insects in its diet.  However, unlike other araneophagic jumping spiders like Portia, Cocalus gibbosus does not pluck on the webs of other spiders.

Species
 it contains six species, found only in Asia, Australia, and Papua New Guinea:
Cocalus concolor C. L. Koch, 1846 (type) – Indonesia, New Guinea
Cocalus gibbosus Wanless, 1981 – Australia (Queensland)
Cocalus lacinia Sudhin, Nafin, Sumesh & Sudhikumar, 2019 – India
Cocalus limbatus Thorell, 1878 – Indonesia
Cocalus menglaensis Cao & Li, 2016 – China
Cocalus murinus Simon, 1899 – India, Indonesia, Singapore (Sumatra)

References

Fauna of Queensland
Salticidae
Salticidae genera
Spiders of Asia
Spiders of Australia
Spiders of Oceania
Taxa named by Carl Ludwig Koch